Kelon, or Klon, (pronounced [kəlon]) is a Papuan language of the western tip of Alor Island in the Alor archipelago of East Nusa Tenggara, Indonesia.

Classification
Klon is a member of the Alor–Pantar languages, within the Timor–Alor–Pantar language family. Klon is part of the Alor subgroup along with Abui, Adang, Blagar, Kamang, Kui, Sawila, and Wersing.

Klon is closely related to the Adang language, spoken across Kalabahi Bay to the north.

Phonology
All the information in this section is from Louise Baird's grammar. Klon has 17 consonant phonemes and 13 vowel phonemes.

Consonants

Aspiration is sometimes produced with voiceless stops. The voiced labio-velar approximant /w/ is infrequently produced as a voiced bilabial fricative [β] by some speakers.

Some of the consonants have a limited distribution. The voiced velar stop /g/ only occurs syllable initially. The voiced velar nasal /ŋ/ only occurs syllable finally. The voiced palatal stop /ɟ/, which only occurs word-finally, in a limited number of words. Some older speakers use the voiced alveolar stop [d] for /ɟ/. The rhotic trill /r/ and the voiceless alveolar fricative /s/ occur both syllable finally and syllable initially. They occur word initially in only a few lexical items each. Some of these lexical items are clearly borrowings. The voiced labio-velar approximant /w/ and the voiced palatal approximant /j/ do not occur syllable-finally.

Vowels

Monophthongs

The mid-front unrounded vowel /e/ and the open mid back rounded vowel /ɔ/ occur infrequently. Schwa only occurs in unstressed syllables.

Diphthongs

Diphthongs occur in both open and closed syllables.

Grammar

Grammatical relations

Klon has split-S alignment. The alignment can be considered agentive. In Klon, the only argument of an intransitive clause (S) is sometimes treated the same as an agent-like argument of a transitive clause (SA=A), and sometimes treated the same as a patient-like argument of a transitive clause (SO=O).

Whether S patterns with A or with O depends on the properties of the S argument, as well as the lexical class of the verb. In one class of verbs, S is coded like A, in another class of verbs S is treated as O, and in the third class of verbs, S can align with A or O, depending on the agentive properties of the S argument. The first verb class, the one which invariably aligns S as A, is the largest class. Only the third class of verbs exhibits fluid S alignment.

For the third verb class, when S has characteristics of an Actor, it patterns like A. When it has characteristics of an Undergoer, (more specifically, when S is an affected participant, but not a volitional and controlling participant) it patterns like O.

The argument of an intransitive may be realized in several ways. A full NP can be used alone, a full NP can be used in combination with a pronoun, or only a pronoun can be used. In all cases the free pronoun is only used with SA arguments, and the bound pronoun with SO arguments. Grammatical relations are not morphologically indicated when arguments are full NPs. Klon has multiple pronominal paradigms. Free pronouns mark A and SA arguments, while bound pronouns indicate O and SO arguments.

In example 1 below, the A argument is indicated by the free pronoun ini, while the O argument instead has the bound pronoun g-.

In example 2, the SO argument is indicated with the bound pronoun n-, and the A argument is represented by the free pronoun na.

In example 3, SA is indicated by the free pronoun ini.

Anaphoric co-reference

When co-referring A and SA arguments occur in paratactically conjoined clauses, the argument in the second clause can be either reduced to a pronoun or deleted.

Similarly, co-referring O and SO arguments which occur in paratactically conjoined clauses allow reduction or deletion of the argument in the second clause.

Word order

The word order of intransitives is SV.

Transitive clauses can have AOV, OAV, or AVO word order. AOV word order disambiguates the A and O arguments when their animacy is equivalent and which argument is which is not otherwise inferrable from context.

Voice

Papuan languages generally lack active-passive voice distinctions. Due to the absence of mention of this topic in Baird's grammar, it is assumed that Klon is a typical Papuan language in this regard.

Valence

Most verbs can occur in intransitive and transitive constructions. Klon speakers seldom use ditransitive clauses. Only the verb en 'to give' is always ditransitive (trivalent). In en constructions, the Primary Undergoer, the recipient, is indicated by a pronominal prefix on the verb; the Secondary Undergoer, the theme, occurs as a full NP.

Valency-decreasing operations

The reciprocal marker t-/to-/tin-/te- indicates that the Actor and Undergoer within a clause are the same referent. Thus, it makes a divalent verb monovalent. The reciprocal marker can only occur with non-singular Actors.

Noun incorporation also decreases valency in Klon.

Valency-increasing operations

The verbal prefix u- increases valency by adding an Undergoer argument. The possible role of the Undergoer includes those of Patient, Theme, Recipient, or Goal.

In the following example, ebeer 'die' has a single Undergoer NP argument doqom 'grandfather'.

In the next example, the Undergoer argument associated with the verb ebeer 'die' is indicated by a third person pronoun verbal prefix, as well as with a full NP Labgei ong 'this Labgei'.

Example 3 is similar to example 2, except now only the pronominal prefix is used to indicate the Undergoer.

Example 4 is in reference to a story about a grandfather beating his grandchildren if they did not get out of bed early in the morning. The speaker uses the inanimate Undergoer argument haib 'danger', as the reason for dying. Hok 'some', refers to the people who die. The u- prefix is used so that ebeer can take the additional argument haib.

The applicative verbal prefix mi- allows an added Undergoer argument as well, but this Undergoer can only be an Instrument.

These two valency-increasing prefixes cannot co-occur on the same verb.

Writing system

The consonant phonemes are written as follows:

 /ʔ/ q
 /ɟ/ j
 /ŋ/ ng
 /j/ y

All other consonants use the same graphemes as IPA.

The short vowel phonemes are written as follows:

 /i/ i
 /e/ é
 /ɛ/ e
 /ə/ ∅ (not written)
 /o/ o
 /ɔ/ ò
 /a/ a

The long vowels are written as double graphemes such as "ee" for /ɛː/.

References

SIM:simultaneous conjunction
1UND:first person undergoer
2UND:second person undergoer
3UND:third person undergoer

External links 
Kelon basic lexicon at the Global Lexicostatistical Database

Alor–Pantar languages
Languages of Indonesia